The Commodore 8280 is a dual 8" floppy disk drive for Commodore International computers. It uses a wide rectangular steel case form similar to that of the Commodore 4040, and uses the parallel IEEE-488 interface common to Commodore PET/CBM computers.

The 8280 replaced the earlier 806x series 8" drives and switched to half-height drives. Like the 8061/62 units, the 8280 supports IBM 3740 disks. However, instead of 500k group code recording (GCR) format used by other Commodore drives, it uses MFM as its native disk recording format, the only 8-bit Commodore drive to do so apart from the 1581. Contrary to the 8061/62, the drive ROM has the capability for formatting disks and verifying them, eliminating the need for external utility disk for these operations. The manual contains also a simple BASIC listing of a program to read sectors from IBM 3470 disks.

References 

CBM floppy disk drives